Steffan Cravos (born 1975, in Cardiff) is a Welsh rap and hip hop musician and artist.

As "DJ Lambchop", Cravos is known for his "rub and scratch" turntablist style. He is also the founding member of Tystion, a Welsh hip hop band.

He was briefly involved with an early line-up of Gorky's Zygotic Mynci playing violin and sound effects, and is credited on several songs on their early-years compilation Patio.

Projects

Fitamin Un
In 1996, Cravos set up his own record label, Recordiau Fitamin Un. Fed up with the scene in Wales, he created it to be an outlet for some of his projects (like Tystion) and other underground material. Other bands released on the label include Llwybr Llaethog, "Pep Le Pew", "Trawsfynydd Lo-Fi Liberation Front", and "Continuous Sound Labordy Swn Cont". All of Fitamin Un's releases have been archived by The National Screen and Sound Archive of Wales at The National Library of Wales.

Radio Amgen
Radio Amgen provides numerous rare mp3's to listen to on the computer. The tracks are from an eclectic mix of artists in both Welsh and English languages, as well as links to artists, labels, other mp3s, and institutions. Radio Amgen translated as Alternative Radio, also gave many amateur djs and music producers the opportunity to showcase their creations. Such successful introducing radio shows include Dander Radio, produced by Aron Jones.

Tystion (1991–2002)
Tystion began in 1991. Cravos, aged 16, and influenced by the sounds of Public Enemy and Dead Kennedys, worked from his bedroom in Carmarthen using two tape decks and a mixer. He wanted to create an answer to the current state of the Welsh musical mainstream. By 1995, he was joined by Gruff Meredith.

Lo-Cut and Sleifar
Cravos worked on this project with Murry the Hump member/producer Lo-Cut (Curig Huws) and put out an album in 2004 on Boobytrap Records. They were based in Cardiff and established their partnership in Paris.

"Music for the feet and music for the mind" — their definition of hip-hop - is the English translation of the title.

Discography

Albums

Welsh language
In April 2005 Cravos became president and chairman of Cymdeithas yr Iaith (Welsh Language Society), having been involved with the society and its activities since the 1990s.

See also
Music of Wales

References

Projects
Brechdan Tywod (in Welsh)
DJ Lambchop
Lo-cut and Sleifer
Radio Amgen (in Welsh)
Tystion
Tystion page (with lyrics)

MP3s
Sleifar a'r Teulu, Sesiwn Radio 1 (in Welsh)

Welsh-language rap
On Rapping in Welsh
Rappers take on the Bards

1977 births
Living people
Musicians from Cardiff
Welsh language activists
Welsh-speaking musicians
Welsh male rappers